Katarzyna Trzopek (born 6 May 1981) is an American fencer. She represented her country at the 2016 Summer Olympics in the team épée fencing event.

See also
List of Pennsylvania State University Olympians

References 

1981 births
Living people
American female épée fencers
Fencers at the 2016 Summer Olympics
Olympic fencers of the United States
Pan American Games medalists in fencing
Pan American Games gold medalists for the United States
Fencers at the 2015 Pan American Games
Medalists at the 2015 Pan American Games
21st-century American women